Nová Ves is a municipality and village in Liberec District in the Liberec Region of the Czech Republic. It has about 900 inhabitants.

Administrative parts
Villages and hamlets of Mlýnice, Nová Víska and Růžek are administrative parts of Nová Ves.

Geography
The southern part of the municipal territory lies in the Zittau Basin, the northern part lies in the Jizera Mountains. The Jeřice River flows through the municipality.

History
The first written mention of Nová Ves is from 1464. The Schwanitz family owned the village from 1498 to 1595, then they sold it to Katharina of Redern. She had built here a church. After the Battle of White Mountain, Nová Ves was acquired by Albrecht von Wallenstein. After that, the village changed several owners in a short period of time. It wasn't until 1712 that the Gallas family bought it and added it to the Liberec estate.

Sights
The landmark of Nová Ves is the Church of the Assumption of the Virgin Mary. It was built in 1616–1617. It was modified at the turn of the 19th and 20th centuries, but kept its Renaissance core.

Notable people
Franz Macoun (1881–1951), Sudeten German politician

Gallery

References

External links

Villages in Liberec District